Jay Foreman (born 3 August 1971) is a former professional English darts player who plays in Professional Darts Corporation events.

Career
He won a PDC Challenge Tour event in 2014, as well as the Macclesfield Open in 2009.

References

External links
Profile and stats on Darts Database

1971 births
Living people
English darts players
Sportspeople from Kent
Professional Darts Corporation associate players